Louis William Bircham "Lou" Engledow  is a retired senior Australian Public Servant, best known for his time as Secretary of the Department of Immigration and Ethnic Affairs between August 1977 and July 1980, and for his contribution to the development of Canberra in various official roles.

Life and career
Between 1973 and 1977, Engledow was Secretary of the Department of the Capital Territory. Before being appointed to the role, he was City Manager in the Department of the Interior, and had also worked in the National Capital Development Commission. As City Manager, he was responsible for daily administrative activities for Canberra and the ACT, including Jervis Bay; these activities included street collections, rates, building plans, consumer protection, bus services and welfare.

In August 1977, Engledow was appointed permanent head of the Department of Immigration and Ethnic Affairs. His appointment lasted until July 1980, when he retired from the public service.

Awards
In the 1978 Queen's Birthday Honours, Engledow was made a Commander of the Order of the British Empire, in recognition of his service to the Australian Public Service.

References

Year of birth missing (living people)
Living people
Secretaries of the Australian Government Immigration Department
Australian Commanders of the Order of the British Empire